James Donald Peterson (born August 18, 1957) is an American lawyer who serves as the Chief United States district judge of the United States District Court for the Western District of Wisconsin.

Biography

Peterson was born on August 18, 1957. He received his Bachelor of Science degree in 1979, Master of Arts degree in 1984 and Doctor of Philosophy in 1986 from the University of Wisconsin–Madison. After graduation, he was a faculty member at the University of Notre Dame, where he taught film and television history. He received his Juris Doctor in 1998 from the University of Wisconsin Law School, graduating Order of the Coif. He served as a law clerk for Judge David G. Deininger of the Wisconsin Court of Appeals from 1998 to 1999. From 1999 to 2014, he had been a shareholder at the Wisconsin law firm of Godfrey & Kahn, S.C., where he was a member of the litigation and intellectual property practice groups and led the firm's intellectual property litigation working group. Additionally, he served as an adjunct faculty member at the University of Wisconsin Law School, where he taught copyright law.

Federal judicial service

On November 7, 2013, President Barack Obama nominated Peterson to serve as a United States district judge of the United States District Court for the Western District of Wisconsin, to the seat vacated by Judge John C. Shabaz, who assumed senior status on January 20, 2009. On February 6, 2014, his nomination was reported out of committee. Cloture was filed on his nomination on May 6, 2014. On Thursday May 8, 2014, the Senate invoked cloture on his nomination by a 56–40 vote. Later the same day, his nomination was confirmed by a 70–24 vote. He received his judicial commission on May 12, 2014. He became Chief Judge on April 26, 2017.

References

External links

1957 births
Living people
Judges of the United States District Court for the Western District of Wisconsin
People from Lake Charles, Louisiana
United States district court judges appointed by Barack Obama
21st-century American judges
University of Notre Dame faculty
University of Wisconsin Law School alumni
University of Wisconsin Law School faculty
University of Wisconsin–Madison faculty
Wisconsin lawyers